Center Township is a township in Doniphan County, Kansas, USA.  As of the 2000 census, its population was 1,743.

History
Center Township (spelled historically Centre) was organized in 1856.

Geography
According to the USGS, it contains four cemeteries: Charleston, Courter-Ritchey, Mount Olive and Saint Charles.

The stream of Mosquito Creek runs through this township.

Transportation
Center Township contains two airports or landing strips: Masters Field and Troy Airport.

References

 USGS Geographic Names Information System (GNIS)

External links
 US-Counties.com
 City-Data.com

Townships in Doniphan County, Kansas
Townships in Kansas
1856 establishments in Kansas Territory